Jakub Popielarz (born March 16, 1990) is a retired Polish footballer who played in midfield.

Career
In the winter 2010, he joined Lechia Gdańsk in the Ekstraklasa from Karpaty Krosno.

References

External links 
 

1990 births
Living people
People from Dukla
Sportspeople from Podkarpackie Voivodeship
Polish footballers
Stal Mielec players
Karpaty Krosno players
Lechia Gdańsk players
Stal Stalowa Wola players
Association football midfielders